KTAA (90.7 FM) is a radio station broadcasting a Christian radio format. Licensed to Big Sandy, Texas, United States, the station serves the Longview-Marshall area.  The station is currently owned by Bott Radio Network, through licensee Community Broadcasting, Inc.

History
The station was assigned the call letters KBAU on 1994-05-06.  On 2000-10-24, the station changed its call sign to the current KTAA.

Translators

References

External links

TAA
Radio stations established in 1994
Bott Radio Network stations
1994 establishments in Texas